Senator Gurney may refer to:

 Charles E. Gurney (1874–1945), member of the Maine State Senate from 1919 to 1922
 Edward Gurney (1914–1996), U.S. Senator from Florida from 1969 to 1974
 John Chandler Gurney (1896–1985), U.S. Senator from South Dakota from 1939 to 1951